Flying Dog is the second studio album released by former Racer X and Mr. Big guitarist Paul Gilbert.

Track listing

Personnel
 Paul Gilbert – vocals, guitars, organ and percussion
 Bruce Bouillet – guitar
 Tony Spinner – guitars and backing vocals
 Mike Szuter – bass guitar and backing vocals
 Johnny Fedevich – drums
 Dave Richardson – piano (Track 1 on disc two)

Production
 Tom Size - Mixing, Engineering

References

External links
Heavy Harmonies page

Paul Gilbert albums
1998 albums
Mercury Records albums